Daniel L. Gard is a retired rear admiral in the United States Navy Reserve and was Deputy Chief of Chaplains for Reserve Matters of the United States Navy Chaplain Corps. He was also the president of Concordia University Chicago.

Civilian career
Gard was the 11th president of Concordia University Chicago, retiring in 2019. He was a member of the faculty of Concordia Theological Seminary from 1989 to 2014, and again since 2019. Previously, he served as a Lutheran pastor in Mishawaka, Indiana.

He is a graduate of Carthage College, Concordia Theological Seminary, and the University of Notre Dame.

Military career
Gard was commissioned a lieutenant (junior grade) in the Navy Reserve in 1988. His assignments include being stationed at Naval Air Station Sigonella, Deputy Force Chaplain and Deputy Director of Operations Ministry of the United States Atlantic Fleet, Deputy Force Chaplain of the United States Marine Corps Reserve and Deputy Chaplain of the United States Marine Corps for Reserve Matters.

Following the September 11 attacks, Gard took part in the recovery operations of The Pentagon. He was later deployed to serve in the Iraq War and as Deputy Force Chaplain for Marine Forces Reserve before serving as Joint Task Force Chaplain of Joint Task Force Guantanamo. In 2013, he served as Deputy Chaplain of the Marine Corps for Reserve Matters. Gard assumed his duties as Rear Admiral and Deputy Chief of Chaplains for Reserve Matters in 2013 and retired in 2016.

Awards he has received include the Legion of Merit, Defense Meritorious Service Medal, the Meritorious Service Medal, the Navy and Marine Corps Commendation Medal and the Navy and Marine Corps Achievement Medal.

References

1954 births
Living people
People from Mishawaka, Indiana
United States Navy rear admirals
United States Navy chaplains
20th-century American Lutheran clergy
Carthage College alumni
Concordia Theological Seminary alumni
University of Notre Dame alumni
21st-century American Lutheran clergy